It Happened in Paris (French: C'est arrivé à Paris) is a 1952 French comedy film directed by Henri Lavorel and John Berry and starring Henri Vidal, Evelyn Keyes and Jean Wall.

Cast
 Henri Vidal as Vladimir Krasnya  
 Evelyn Keyes as Patricia Moran  
 Jean Wall as Hugo  
 Frédéric O'Brady as Otto 
 Nicolas Amato 
 Andrès 
 Jean-François Calvé 
 Marcel Charvey as Le maître d'hotel  
 Max Dalban as Le boucher  
 André Dalibert as Le fleuriste  
 Paul Faivre as Le turfiste  
 Pierre Gay as Le barman  
 Émile Genevois as Le groom  
 Camille Guérini as Le père de la petite fille  
 Clément Harari 
 Fred Hébert 
 Kirchberger 
 Robert Lombard as Marcel  
 Paul Mesnier 
 Bernard Musson as Le contrôleur à la gare  
 Jean Ozenne as L'oncle  
 Germaine Reuver as Madame Poteau  
 André Roanne as Le gérant du restaurant  
 Pierre Sergeol as Le garagiste  
 Michel Vadet

References

Bibliography 
 Rebecca Prime. Hollywood Exiles in Europe: The Blacklist and Cold War Film Culture. Rutgers University Press, 2014.

External links 
 

1952 films
1952 comedy films
French comedy films
1950s French-language films
Films directed by Henri Lavorel
Films directed by John Berry
Films set in Paris
French black-and-white films
Films scored by Norbert Glanzberg
1950s French films